Bullet Train is a 2022 American action comedy film starring Brad Pitt as an assassin who must battle fellow killers while riding a bullet train. The film was directed by David Leitch from a screenplay by Zak Olkewicz, and produced by Antoine Fuqua, who initially conceived the film. It is based on the 2010 novel Maria Beetle (titled Bullet Train in the UK and US edition), written by Kōtarō Isaka and translated by Sam Malissa, the second novel in Isaka's Hitman trilogy, of which the first novel was previously adapted as the 2015 Japanese film Grasshopper. The film also features an ensemble supporting cast including Joey King, Aaron Taylor-Johnson, Brian Tyree Henry, Andrew Koji, Hiroyuki Sanada, Michael Shannon, Benito A. Martínez Ocasio, and Sandra Bullock.

Principal photography began in Los Angeles in November 2020 and wrapped in March 2021. Bullet Train premiered in Paris on July 18, 2022, and was theatrically released in the United States on August 5, 2022, by Sony Pictures Releasing. The film received mixed reviews from critics and grossed $239.3 million worldwide on a production budget of around $85.9–90 million.

Plot

Yuichi Kimura, "The Father", boards a bullet train in Tokyo in search of the attacker of his son Wataru. Meanwhile, guided by his handler Maria Beetle, operative "Ladybug" is assigned to retrieve a briefcase full of cash from the same train, replacing a sick colleague, Carver. Ladybug is reluctant, as his recent string of bad luck during his jobs resulted in accidental deaths. Also on the train are two English assassin brothers codenamed "Lemon" and "Tangerine", who just rescued a man ("The Son") from kidnappers and are taking him and the briefcase to his father, a Russian-born Yakuza boss called "The White Death".

During the trip, The Son is killed by poisoning. Ladybug discreetly steals the briefcase, but on his way off the train, is attacked by another assassin, codenamed "The Wolf", who recognizes Ladybug from his wedding, where his wife was killed. The Wolf mistakenly believes Ladybug to be one of her killers. Ladybug confusedly fights The Wolf, who accidentally kills himself with a deflected knife throw. Yuichi finds the person who attacked Wataru, a young woman codenamed "The Prince", but she overpowers him. She explains that she pushed Wataru off a roof to lure Yuichi to the train as part of a plan to have him kill his boss: the White Death. To ensure his cooperation, she has a henchman holding Wataru hostage in the hospital.

Ladybug, recognizing Lemon from a job in Johannesburg gone wrong, offers to return the case in exchange for being allowed to leave. Lemon suspects that Ladybug killed The Son, leading to a fight. Lemon is knocked unconscious during the fight, and privately discusses Ladybug's innocence to Tangerine (due to him having left him unconscious instead of killing him), before both split off to find Ladybug and frame him for the Son's murder. The Prince finds the briefcase, booby-traps it with explosives, and rigs Yuichi's gun to explode if fired. Ladybug encounters Tangerine, and after avoiding the White Death's men, kicks Tangerine off the train as the train departs, who manages to climb back aboard from outside. Suspicious of the two, Lemon shoots Yuichi but collapses after drinking from a water bottle Ladybug had previously spiked with sleeping powder.

The Prince shoots Lemon and conceals him and Yuichi in a bathroom. Ladybug encounters yet another assassin, "The Hornet", who poisoned both the Wolf's wedding party and the Son with the venom of a boomslang snake. After a struggle, both are exposed to the venom, but only Ladybug receives an anti-venom that saves him. Tangerine runs into the Prince and notices one of Lemon's train stickers on her, realizing that she shot Lemon. Ladybug interrupts them, and Tangerine is killed before he can shoot the Prince. At the next stop, Yuichi's father, "The Elder", boards the train. He recognizes the Prince and informs her that Wataru is safe, as the henchman has been killed by his guard. After she flees, the Elder tells Ladybug he will remain to confront the White Death, who killed his wife while taking over the Yakuza.

Finding Yuichi and Lemon still alive, the four work together to make preparations to face the White Death. At Kyoto, Ladybug gives the White Death the briefcase. The Prince, revealed to be the White Death's daughter, fails to goad him into shooting her with the rigged gun. The White Death explains that everyone on the train was linked to the death of his wife. He hired them hoping they would kill each other, not knowing Carver (his wife's killer) was replaced by Ladybug. The White Death's henchmen open the briefcase, which explodes, knocking Ladybug and the White Death back onto the train. The White Death's remaining henchmen board and battle the assassins, while the Elder duels the White Death.

The train crashes into downtown Kyoto. Emerging from the wreck, impaled with the Elder's katana, the White Death tries to kill Ladybug, but the Prince's rigged gun explodes in his face. The Prince threatens Ladybug, Yuichi, and the Elder with a machine gun but is run over by a fruit truck driven by Lemon, who fell off the train earlier. Maria arrives to retrieve Ladybug, while Japanese authorities begin to clean up the damage caused by the train crash.

Cast

In addition, Channing Tatum and Ryan Reynolds appear in uncredited cameo roles as a train passenger and as assassin Carver, respectively. Reynolds accepted the cameo as a thank-you to Pitt for his own cameo in Deadpool 2 (2018). The film's director, David Leitch, appears briefly as the 17th person killed (albeit unintentionally) by Lemon and Tangerine while freeing The Son.

Production

Bullet Train had been initially developed by Antoine Fuqua—who co-produced the film—through his Fuqua Films banner. It was originally intended to be a serious action thriller, but the project turned into a light-hearted action comedy during the development process.

It was announced in June 2020 that Sony Pictures had hired David Leitch to direct the adaptation of the Kōtarō Isaka sequel novel from a screenplay by Zak Olkewicz, with Brad Pitt being cast in the film the following month. Variety reported that Pitt was paid $20 million. Joey King subsequently entered negotiations for a supporting role, while in September, Andrew Koji was added, with Aaron Taylor-Johnson and Brian Tyree Henry joining in October. In November 2020, Zazie Beetz, Masi Oka, Michael Shannon, Logan Lerman, and Hiroyuki Sanada joined the cast, with Leitch revealing in December that Karen Fukuhara had also joined, and that Jonathan Sela would serve as cinematographer. That same month, singer Bad Bunny (credited as his real name, Benito A Martínez Ocasio) was also added to the cast, and Sandra Bullock joined the following year in February to replace Lady Gaga, who had dropped out due to scheduling conflicts with House of Gucci (2021).

Production for Bullet Train began in October 2020 in Los Angeles.
The production budget was reportedly $85.9 to 90 million.
Filming started on November 16, 2020, and wrapped in March 2021. The producers constructed three full train cars, and LED screens with video footage of the Japanese countryside were hung outside the windows of the train set to help immerse the actors. Stunt coordinator Greg Rementer said Pitt performed 95 percent of his own stunts in the film.

Music

The film features a number of original tracks. Most notably, the film contains Japanese-language covers of "Stayin' Alive" by Bee Gees and "Holding Out for a Hero" by Bonnie Tyler. Composer Dominic Lewis noted that the film's soundtrack represents "all vibe and no technique".

Release
Bullet Train was originally set to be released on April 8, 2022, before being delayed to July 15, 2022, again to July 29, and then to August 5. Its world premiere occurred at the Grand Rex in Paris, France on July 18, 2022.

The film was released on 4K UHD, Blu-ray and DVD on October 18, 2022, with the digital version released on September 27, 2022. Bullet Train was released on Netflix in the USA on December 3, 2022, as part of a deal made by Sony and Netflix in 2021.

Reception

Box office 
Bullet Train grossed $103.4 million in the United States and Canada, and $135.9 million in other territories, for a worldwide total of $239.3 million.

In the United States and Canada, Bullet Train was released alongside Easter Sunday, and was projected to gross $26–30 million from 4,357 theaters in its opening weekend. The film made $12.6 million on its first day, including $4.6 million from Thursday night previews. It went on to debut to $30 million, topping the box office. The film made $13.4 million in its sophomore weekend, remaining in first. The film made $8 million in its third weekend, falling to third.

Critical response 
On Rotten Tomatoes, 54% of 328 critics gave the film a positive review, with an average rating of 5.6/10. The website's critics consensus reads, "Bullet Trains colorful cast and high-speed action are almost enough to keep things going after the story runs out of track." Metacritic assigned the film a weighted average score of 49 out of 100, based on 61 critics, indicating "mixed or average reviews". Audiences polled by CinemaScore gave the film an average grade of "B+" on an A+ to F scale, while PostTrak gave the film an 82% overall positive score, with 63% saying they would definitely recommend it.

Richard Roeper of the Chicago Sun-Times rated the film three and a half out of four stars, calling it "wildly entertaining" and praised the performances, "the creative and blood-spattered action sequences" and most of all the writing. Peter Debruge of Variety wrote, "Bullet Train feels like it comes from the same brain as Snatch, wearing its pop style on its sleeve a Kill Bill-like mix of martial arts, manga and gabby hitman movie influences, minus the vision or wit that implies."

Representation of race in casting 
The casting of several non-Asian actors, including Brad Pitt and Joey King, prompted accusations of whitewashing characters who were Japanese in Kōtarō Isaka's novel. David Inoue, executive director of the Japanese American Citizens League, criticized the casting, explaining that while American actors would have been appropriate if the setting were changed to the United States, the filmmakers used the novel's Japanese setting while keeping Japanese characters in the film's background, strengthening charges of whitewashing. Inoue also questioned the actors' allyship to the Asian community for knowingly accepting whitewashed roles, and further criticized the film for pushing the "belief that Asian actors in the leading roles cannot carry a blockbuster", despite the recent successes of Asian-led films such as Crazy Rich Asians (2018) or Shang-Chi and the Legend of the Ten Rings (2021).

King appeared in the film despite having previously said "I do not believe a white woman should play a character of color. Not me or any other white woman for that matter." Eric Francisco of Inverse wrote, "Unless you saw the individual character posters, you'd be unlikely to think Bullet Train actually stars any Asian talent. Hollywood supposedly doesn't cast Asian leads because they aren't stars, but the truth is, they aren't stars because Hollywood won't cast Asian leads. How can audiences get excited about buying tickets to see Asian actors when their existence in a movie is barely acknowledged?"

When asked about the casting, Isaka defended the film and described his characters as "ethnically malleable", maintaining that his original Japanese setting and context were irrelevant as they were "not real people, maybe they're not even Japanese." Sony Pictures Motion Picture Group president Sanford Panitch highlighted Isaka's views to defend the casting, reassuring that the film would honor the novel's "Japanese soul" while giving the opportunity to cast big name stars and adapt it on a "global scale". Bullet Train screenwriter Zak Olkewicz argued that the decision to cast beyond Japanese or Asian actors proved "the strength of [Isaka]'s work" as it was a story that could "transcend race". Director David Leitch noted that discussions had taken place during pre-production to change the film's setting, but it was ultimately decided to keep Isaka's original location Tokyo due to its international appeal. Jana Monji of AsAm News highlighted the underrepresentation and misrepresentation of Asians in the film and responded to Olkewicz's comment, "That sounds like White privilege providing an excuse for exclusion."

Francisco mentioned that the Japanese author and most audiences in Asia "enjoy their own domestic film industry and go to Hollywood for the spectacle of foreigners", noting the differences between Asians in Asia and Asian American issues.

Accolades 
At the 2022 People's Choice Awards, the film was nominated for Movie of 2022, and Action Movie of 2022, Brad Pitt was nominated for Male Movie Star of 2022, and Joey King was nominated for Female Movie Star of 2022, and Action Movie Star of 2022.

References

External links
 
 

Bullet Train
2022 action comedy films
2022 crime thriller films
2020s American films
2020s comedy thriller films
2020s crime comedy films
2020s English-language films
American action comedy films
American comedy thriller films
American crime comedy films
American crime thriller films
Casting controversies in film
Films about the Russian Mafia
Films based on Japanese novels
Films directed by David Leitch
Films impacted by the COVID-19 pandemic
Films produced by Antoine Fuqua
Films scored by Dominic Lewis
Films set in Kyoto
Films set in Tokyo
Films set on trains
Films shot in Japan
Films shot in Los Angeles
IMAX films
Japan in non-Japanese culture
Midlife crisis films
Race-related controversies in film
Shinkansen
TSG Entertainment films
Yakuza films